Eulechria is a genus of moths of the family Oecophoridae.

Species
Eulechria absona (Turner, 1917)
Eulechria aclina (Turner, 1932)
Eulechria acrotropa (Meyrick, 1884)
Eulechria adoxodes (Turner, 1933)
Eulechria ancyrota (Meyrick, 1883)
Eulechria aphaura Meyrick, 1888
Eulechria arctans (Lucas, 1900)
Eulechria argolina (Meyrick, 1889)
Eulechria atmospila Turner, 1916
Eulechria auantis (Meyrick, 1889)
Eulechria autographa (Meyrick, 1902)
Eulechria balanota (Meyrick, 1889)
Eulechria basiplaga (Walker, 1863)
Eulechria calamaea (Turner, 1935)
Eulechria callidesma (Lower, 1894)
Eulechria capsellata Meyrick, 1913
Eulechria catharistis Turner, 1916
Eulechria celata Meyrick, 1913
Eulechria ceratina (Meyrick, 1884)
Eulechria ceratochroa Lower, 1920
Eulechria cerinata Meyrick, 1914
Eulechria chersomicta (Meyrick, 1920)
Eulechria chionospila (Turner, 1941)
Eulechria chrysodeta (Turner, 1941)
Eulechria chrysomochla Turner, 1937
Eulechria chrysozona (Turner, 1896)
Eulechria clytophanes (Turner, 1941)
Eulechria cocytias (Meyrick, 1915)
Eulechria colonialis Meyrick, 1936
Eulechria contentella (Walker, 1864)
Eulechria convictella (Walker, 1864)
Eulechria corsota Meyrick, 1914
Eulechria delicia (Turner, 1917)
Eulechria delospila Turner, 1916
Eulechria delosticta (Turner, 1944)
Eulechria diacrita (Turner, 1917)
Eulechria diasticha Turner, 1937
Eulechria diaphanes Turner, 1898
Eulechria dichroa (Lower, 1893)
Eulechria dolichotricha (Turner, 1927)
Eulechria drosocapna Meyrick, 1920
Eulechria dysimera Turner, 1938
Eulechria eborinella (Snellen, 1901)
Eulechria elaphropa (Turner, 1936)
Eulechria electrodes (Meyrick, 1884)
Eulechria empheres Turner, 1938
Eulechria encratodes Meyrick, 1922
Eulechria epicausta Meyrick, 1883
Eulechria epimicta (Meyrick, 1886)
Eulechria eremnopa (Turner, 1917)
Eulechria eriphila Meyrick, 1888
Eulechria euadelpha (Lower, 1901)
Eulechria eucrita (Turner, 1917)
Eulechria eurycneca Turner, 1937
Eulechria eurygramma Turner, 1915
Eulechria exanimis Meyrick, 1883
Eulechria gypsochroa Turner, 1937
Eulechria habrosema (Turner, 1944)
Eulechria haplopepla Turner, 1938
Eulechria haplophara (Turner, 1915)
Eulechria haplopolia Turner, 1938
Eulechria haplosticta Turner, 1938
Eulechria heliocoma Meyrick, 1888
Eulechria heliodora Meyrick, 1888
Eulechria heliophanes (Lower, 1894)
Eulechria hemiochra (Turner, 1935)
Eulechria hemisphaerica (Meyrick, 1886)
Eulechria hilda (Turner, 1917)
Eulechria holodascia Turner, 1938
Eulechria homochra Turner, 1938
Eulechria homopela (Turner, 1933)
Eulechria homophyes (Turner, 1941)
Eulechria homospora Meyrick, 1913
Eulechria homoteles Meyrick, 1888
Eulechria homotona (Meyrick, 1884)
Eulechria hymenaea Meyrick, 1902
Eulechria increta Meyrick, 1931
Eulechria ischnota (Lower, 1903)
Eulechria isogramma (Meyrick, 1884)
Eulechria isozona (Lower, 1901)
Eulechria jugata Meyrick, 1914
Eulechria leptobela Meyrick, 1883
Eulechria leptocneca (Turner, 1933)
Eulechria leptopasta Turner, 1938
Eulechria leptosema Common, 1996
Eulechria lissophanes Turner, 1938
Eulechria lissopolia (Turner, 1927)
Eulechria lunata (Turner, 1896)
Eulechria machinosa Meyrick, 1913
Eulechria malacoptera Meyrick, 1888
Eulechria malacostola (Turner, 1941)
Eulechria marmorata (Meyrick, 1889)
Eulechria mechanica (Meyrick, 1889)
Eulechria melanoploca (Meyrick, 1884)
Eulechria melesella (Newman, 1856)
Eulechria metacroca (Turner, 1944)
Eulechria metarga (Turner, 1939)
Eulechria micranepsia Turner, 1938
Eulechria microschema (Meyrick, 1883)
Eulechria modesta (Turner, 1944)
Eulechria nephelella (Turner, 1898)
Eulechria nigricincta (Meyrick, 1921)
Eulechria niphobola Lower, 1920
Eulechria omosema Meyrick, 1920
Eulechria ophiodes (Meyrick, 1889)
Eulechria orbitalis Meyrick, 1922
Eulechria orbitosa Meyrick, 1920
Eulechria orestera (Turner, 1917)
Eulechria orgiastis (Meyrick, 1889)
Eulechria oxytona (Turner, 1916)
Eulechria pallidella Meyrick, 1883
Eulechria pantelella Meyrick, 1883
Eulechria pastea (Turner, 1927)
Eulechria paurophylla (Turner, 1916)
Eulechria pelina Turner, 1938
Eulechria pelodora Meyrick, 1888
Eulechria pentamera (Lower, 1893)
Eulechria pentatypa (Turner, 1941)
Eulechria perdita Meyrick, 1883
Eulechria periphanes (Turner, 1944)
Eulechria permeata (Meyrick, 1913)
Eulechria phaeina (Turner, 1896)
Eulechria phaeopsamma Meyrick, 1913
Eulechria phoenissa Meyrick, 1902
Eulechria pissograpta Turner, 1938
Eulechria placina (Turner, 1939)
Eulechria platyrrhabda Turner, 1937
Eulechria polioleuca (Turner, 1933)
Eulechria psaritis (Turner, 1933)
Eulechria psilopla (Meyrick, 1884)
Eulechria pulverea (Meyrick, 1884)
Eulechria pyrgophora (Turner, 1941)
Eulechria rhymodes Meyrick, 1914
Eulechria roborata Meyrick, 1914
Eulechria salsicola Meyrick, 1914
Eulechria sciaphila Turner, 1927
Eulechria sciosticha (Turner, 1941)
Eulechria semophanes (Meyrick, 1889)
Eulechria sigmophora (Meyrick, 1884)
Eulechria sphaeroides (Turner, 1896)
Eulechria sphodra (Turner, 1941)
Eulechria spreta Turner, 1939
Eulechria stadiota (Meyrick, 1889)
Eulechria stigmatophora Turner, 1896
Eulechria stoechodes (Turner, 1936)
Eulechria subpunctella (Walker, 1864)
Eulechria suffusa (Turner, 1936)
Eulechria symbleta (Turner, 1914)
Eulechria syngenes (Turner, 1941)
Eulechria tanysticha Turner, 1937
Eulechria tephrochroa Turner, 1916
Eulechria theorica (Meyrick, 1884)
Eulechria thermochroa (Meyrick, 1884)
Eulechria theticophara Turner, 1938
Eulechria thiopepla (Turner, 1939)
Eulechria threnodes Turner, 1916
Eulechria timida Meyrick, 1914
Eulechria tolmera (Turner, 1941)
Eulechria triferella (Walker, 1864)
Eulechria typicantha Meyrick, 1918
Eulechria vaporata Meyrick, 1914
Eulechria vegrandis (Meyrick, 1884)
Eulechria velata Meyrick, 1914
Eulechria xanthophylla Turner, 1937
Eulechria xenomima (Meyrick, 1913)
Eulechria xeropterella Common, 1996
Eulechria xuthophylla Turner, 1937
Eulechria xuthoptila Turner, 1938
Eulechria zophoessa Meyrick, 1883
Eulechria zophoptera Turner, 1938
Eulechria zoropa Turner, 1938
Eulechria leucochrysa (Diakonoff, 1954)
Eulechria messoria (Meyrick, 1914)
Eulechria mitrocosma (Turner, 1941)
Eulechria abrithes (Turner, 1936)
Eulechria amaloptera (Turner, 1936)
Eulechria autophylla Meyrick, 1888
Eulechria basipuncta Turner, 1938
Eulechria basixantha Turner, 1938
Eulechria centridias Meyrick, 1920
Eulechria centroleuca Turner, 1938
Eulechria cholerodes Meyrick, 1888
Eulechria delotypa (Turner, 1936)
Eulechria diagramma Meyrick, 1888
Eulechria dyspines (Turner, 1936)
Eulechria epichrista Turner, 1937
Eulechria griseola (Zeller, 1855)
Eulechria haemopa Turner, 1938
Eulechria halmopeda Meyrick, 1888
Eulechria homochalca Meyrick, 1888
Eulechria homoxesta Meyrick, 1888
Eulechria hypnotis (Meyrick, 1889)
Eulechria indecora Turner, 1938
Eulechria infestata Meyrick, 1914
Eulechria isopsepha Meyrick, 1914
Eulechria maesta Turner, 1938
Eulechria monoda Lower, 1907
Eulechria paraleuca Lower, 1907
Eulechria pentasticta (Turner, 1936)
Eulechria phaeogramma (Turner, 1936)
Eulechria photinopis Lower, 1900
Eulechria pleurocapna (Turner, 1936)
Eulechria plinthochroa Turner, 1938
Eulechria pusilla (Turner, 1936)
Eulechria quaerenda Meyrick, 1920
Eulechria scioides Turner, 1937
Eulechria scotiodes Meyrick, 1902
Eulechria semelella (Newman, 1856)
Eulechria semnostola (Lower, 1901)
Eulechria sericopa (Lower, 1915)
Eulechria stenoptila (Turner, 1917)
Eulechria stramenticia (Turner, 1936)
Eulechria styracista Meyrick, 1920
Eulechria suppletella (Walker, 1864)
Eulechria synaptospila Turner, 1938
Eulechria tetraploa Turner, 1896
Eulechria themerodes (Meyrick, 1902)
Eulechria zemiodes Meyrick, 1902
Eulechria zophoessa Meyrick, 1883

References

Markku Savela's ftp.funet.fi

 
Oecophorinae